Sheila Doyle Russell (September 29, 1935 – December 12, 2022) was an American politician who served as the 66th mayor of Cambridge, Massachusetts, and was a 14-year member of the Cambridge City Council. She retired in 1999. Russell and fellow mayor and councilman Francis Duehay were called “basically … the heart and soul” of the City Council.
Her husband was himself former Cambridge mayor Leonard J. Russell. 

The West Cambridge Youth Center at 680 Huron Avenue in Cambridge is named after her as the "Mayor Sheila Doyle Russell Youth and Community Center."

References

1935 births
2022 deaths
Cambridge, Massachusetts City Council members
Mayors of Cambridge, Massachusetts
Women mayors of places in Massachusetts